Rue Victor Hugo may refer to several streets in Francophone countries named after Victor Hugo:
 Rue Victor Hugo in Schaerbeek (Brussels)
 Avenue Victor-Hugo in Boulogne-Billancourt
 Rue Victor-Hugo in Carcassonne
 Rue Victor-Hugo in Lyon
 Avenue Victor-Hugo in Paris